Ocellularia is a genus of lichens in the family Graphidaceae. The genus was circumscribed by Georg Friedrich Wilhelm Meyer in 1825.

Species

Ocellularia africana
Ocellularia allosporoides
Ocellularia andamanica
Ocellularia antillensis
Ocellularia aptrootiana
Ocellularia arecae
Ocellularia asiatica
Ocellularia auberianoides
Ocellularia auratipruinosa
Ocellularia aurulenta
Ocellularia bahiana
Ocellularia baileyi
Ocellularia balangoda
Ocellularia bicuspidata
Ocellularia bipindensis
Ocellularia bonplandiae
Ocellularia brunneospora
Ocellularia bullata
Ocellularia cameroonensis
Ocellularia cavata
Ocellularia chiriquiensis
Ocellularia clandestina
Ocellularia cloonanii
Ocellularia concolor
Ocellularia confluens
Ocellularia conglomerata
Ocellularia crocea
Ocellularia cruentata
Ocellularia decolorata
Ocellularia diacida
Ocellularia diospyri
Ocellularia discoidea
Ocellularia domingensis
Ocellularia ecolumellata
Ocellularia ecorticata
Ocellularia eumorpha
Ocellularia eumorphoides
Ocellularia exanthismocarpa
Ocellularia exuta
Ocellularia fecunda
Ocellularia flavescens
Ocellularia flavisorediata
Ocellularia fumosa
Ocellularia gibberulosa
Ocellularia henatomma
Ocellularia interposita
Ocellularia inthanonensis
Ocellularia inturgescens
Ocellularia jacinda-arderniae – New Zealand
Ocellularia kalbii
Ocellularia khuntanensis
Ocellularia krathingensis
Ocellularia kurandensis
Ocellularia landronii
Ocellularia leioplacoides
Ocellularia lumbschii – Vietnam
Ocellularia massalongoi
Ocellularia mauritiana
Ocellularia melanophthalma
Ocellularia melanotremata
Ocellularia microstoma
Ocellularia minutula
Ocellularia mordenii
Ocellularia mozambica
Ocellularia neoleucina
Ocellularia neoperforata
Ocellularia neopertusariiformis
Ocellularia orthomastia
Ocellularia papillata
Ocellularia perforata
Ocellularia phaeotropa
Ocellularia pluriporoides
Ocellularia polydisca
Ocellularia postposita
Ocellularia profunda
Ocellularia pyrenuloides
Ocellularia raveniana
Ocellularia reticulata
Ocellularia rhabdospora
Ocellularia rhicnoporoides
Ocellularia rhodostroma
Ocellularia ripleyi
Ocellularia roseotecta
Ocellularia saxicola – Vietnam
Ocellularia subgranulosa
Ocellularia subleucina
Ocellularia subsimilis
Ocellularia tenuis
Ocellularia thelotremoides
Ocellularia turbinata
Ocellularia verrucosa
Ocellularia vezdana
Ocellularia viridis
Ocellularia wirthii
Ocellularia wolseleyana
Ocellularia xanthostroma
Ocellularia zenkeri

References

 
Lichen genera
Ostropales genera
Taxa described in 1825